Hamilton Hall can refer to several buildings including:

Hamilton Hall (Columbia University)
Hamilton Hall (Salem, Massachusetts)
Hamilton Hall (University of St Andrews). The previous name of the Hamilton Grand

Architectural disambiguation pages